Automator may refer to:
 Dan 'The Automator' Nakamura, a hip-hop and rap producer
 Automator, a feature of macOS